Tupac: Resurrection is a 2003 American documentary film about the life and death of rapper Tupac Shakur. The film, directed by Lauren Lazin and released by Paramount Pictures, is narrated by Shakur himself. The film was in theaters from November 16, 2003, to December 21, 2003. As of July 1, 2008 it had earned over $7.8 million, making it the 21st-highest-grossing documentary film in the United States - (in nominal dollars, from 1982 to the present). The film was nominated for the Academy Award for Best Documentary Feature at the 77th Academy Awards.

Synopsis
Tupac details his childhood, from growing up with a crackhead mother to being taken care of by drug dealers on the streets, as well as the type of jobs he had to do to get money. He also talks about his love for poetry, his friendship with Jada, what his lyrics mean, and about the negative resentment the media has had on him. This documentary then details his shooting, his reaction to getting shot, his paranoia after getting shot, and ultimately his death. The documentary ends with Tupac coming to terms with his life and his past, understanding the wrongs that he has done, as well as giving a monologue about stereotypes of Black men, telling Blacks to not give in to stereotypes and to control themselves, and it also shows the impact Tupac has had on the entire world.

Reception

Critical response
Tupac: Resurrection has an approval rating of 78% on review aggregator website Rotten Tomatoes, based on 90 reviews, and an average rating of 6.75/10. The website's critical consensus states, "There's no question where the director's loyalty lies in this one-sided tribute; however, Tupac's charisma makes this doc an engaging sit". Metacritic assigned the film a weighted average score of 66 out of 100, based on 33 critics, indicating "generally favorable reviews".

Soundtrack

An official 14-track soundtrack album was released, although it only contained nine songs that featured in the movie.  The following tracks, listed alphabetically by title, are written and/or performed by Tupac and feature in the film:

 2 of Amerikaz Most Wanted
 Ballad of a Dead Soulja
 Black Jesuz
 Breathin
 Brenda's Got a Baby
 California Love Remix
 Can U C the Pride in the Panther - Performed by Mos Def
 Case of the Misplaced Mic
 Changes
 Cradle to the Grave
 Dear Mama
 Everything They Owe
 Fame
 Family Tree - Performed by Lamar Antwon Robinson
 Hail Mary
 Hell 4 a Hustler
 Hit 'Em Up
 Holler If Ya Hear Me
 Homeboyz
 I Get Around
 I'm Gettin Money
 If I Die 2 Nite
 Keep Ya Head Up
 Let Em Have It
 Letter to the President
 Lil' Homies
 Me Against the World
 Military Minds
 My Block (Nitty Remix)
 My Closest Roaddogz
 Never B Peace (Nitty Remix)
 Niggaz Nature Remix
 Nothin' to Lose
 One Day at a Time (Em's Version)
 Only Fear of Death
 Open Fire
 Outlaw
 Panther Power
 Part Time Mutha
 The Realist Killas
 Rebel of the Underground
 Runnin' (Dying to Live)
 Same Song – Performed by Digital Underground
 Secretz of War
 So Many Tears
 St. Ides Malt Liquor Commercial
 Starin' Through My Rear View
 Still Ballin' (Nitty Remix)
 Street Fame (Briss Remix)
 Strictly for My N.I.G.G.A.Z.
 Super Freak
 Temptations
 Thug N U Thug N Me
 Thugz Mansion (7 Remix)
 Trapped
 U Can Call (Jazze Pha Remix)
 Under Pressure
 Until the End of Time
 U R Ripping Us Apart!!! - Performed by Dead Prez
 When Thugz Cry
 When We Ride on Our Enemies (Briss Remix)
 Wife 4 Life - 4th Avenue Jones'
 Wonda Why They Call U Bitch
 Worldwide Mob Figgaz
 Y'all Don't Know Us
 You Don't Bring Me Flowers (feat. Ice T)

The following tracks, which Tupac had no input on, are also featured in the film:

 America The Beautiful
 All Along The Watchtower - Jimi Hendrix
 All That You Have Is Your Soul - Tracy Chapman
 Black Seeds Keep On Growing
 Exodus - Bob Marley
 Humpty Dance - Digital Underground
 Inner City Blues - Marvin Gaye
 Know The Ledge - Eric B. & Rakim
 Living For The City - Stevie Wonder
 Paid In Full - Eric B. & Rakim
 Parents Just Don't Understand - DJ Jazzy Jeff & The Fresh Prince
 Smooth Operator - Sade
 Vincent - Don McLean
 Waiting For You - Tony! Toni! Tone!
 Wuthering Heights - Kate Bush

Certifications

References

External links
 Official site

Tupac: Resurrection at Rotten Tomatoes
Box Office Mojo
Tupac Amaru Shakur Foundation Official Site

2003 films
2003 documentary films
American documentary films
Documentary films about hip hop music and musicians
2000s English-language films
Films directed by Lauren Lazin
Films shot in Baltimore
MTV Films films
Paramount Pictures films
Works about Tupac Shakur
2000s American films